WXYM (96.1 FM, "Mix 96.1") is a radio station broadcasting a hot adult contemporary music radio format. Licensed to Tomah, Wisconsin, United States, the station serves the greater La Crosse, Wisconsin, area.  The station is currently owned by Magnum Broadcasting and features programming from AP Radio, Compass Media Networks and Premiere Networks.

History
The station was assigned call sign WTRL-FM on August 8, 1990.  On February 7, 1992, the station changed its call sign to WBOG, again on February 3, 1997, to WUSK, and on October 20, 2000, to the current WXYM. From 2019 to 2020, the station re-broadcast on 107.1 from WKBH-FM HD3 until it became "Alt 107.1." On September 7, 2021, WXYM added Elvis Duran for mornings.

References

External links

XYM
Hot adult contemporary radio stations in the United States
Radio stations established in 1990